Kovid Gupta (born 1988) is an Indian-American author, screenwriter, filmmaker, and social activist. He is best known for his non-fiction books Kingdom of The Soap Queen: The Story of Balaji Telefilms and Redrawing India: The Teach For India Story.

Early life
Gupta was born and raised in Houston. As a child he was interested in Bollywood films.

He earned three bachelor's degrees from the University of Texas at Austin from the McCombs School of Business, Moody College of Communication, and College of Liberal Arts followed by an MBA from Cornell University.

Career
Kovid began his career by screenwriting mainstream Hindi television soap operas.<ref>{{cite news|title=Prem Ratan Dhan Payo Assistant Director Kovid Gupta on Carving a Path into Bollywood.|url=http://www.india.com/arts-and-culture/prem-ratan-dhan-payo-assistant-director-kovid-gupta-on-carving-a-path-into-bollyood-700145/|newspaper=Business Standard|accessdate=25 March 2016}}</ref> He went on to work for Ekta Kapoor and Balaji Telefilms, where he authored Kingdom of The Soap Queen: The Story of Balaji Telefilms. He later joined Rajshri Productions to assist Sooraj Barjatya on Prem Ratan Dhan Payo. He then worked as head of business development at Vinod Chopra Films and Film Companion.Forbes included Gupta in the 2017 Forbes 30 Under 30 Asia Media, Marketing, & Advertising list.

In 2018, Gupta turned producer and founded Kovid Gupta Films.

Bibliography

Filmography
Producer
 Mind Games (Filming)

Screenwriter
 Balika Vadhu (2010)
 Bade Acche Lagte Hain (2011)
 Hamaar Sautan Hamaar Saheli (2011)
 Chhan Chhan (2013)
 Bahu Hamari Rajni Kant (2016)
 Krishnadasi (2016 TV series) (2016)
 Devanshi (TV series) (2016)

Assistant Director
 Prem Ratan Dhan Payo (2015)

Awards
 Forbes 30 Under 30 Asia (2017) 
 McCombs School of Business Rising Star  (2019)

References

External links
 
 An interview with Kovid Gupta (September 2014 interview)''

21st-century American novelists
1988 births
Living people
American novelists of Indian descent
American male novelists
Moody College of Communication alumni
Novelists from Texas
Writers from Houston
Rajasthani people
21st-century American male writers
Cornell University alumni
University of Texas at Austin alumni
McCombs School of Business alumni
Klein High School alumni